The Waterloo Downtown Historic District in Waterloo, Wisconsin is a  historic district which was listed on the National Register of Historic Places in 2000.

Description
The district is made up of the old downtown of Waterloo, including the 1874 Italianate-styled Muebus & Fiebeger's Double Block, the 1885 Brandner dry goods store, the 1893 Queen Anne-styled Doering Block, the 1896 Becken's Saloon, the 1897 Failinger general store, the 1923 Neoclassical Community Hall, the 1924 Colonial Revival-ish Stoke Brothers Auto Filling Station, and the 1938 Arte Moderne Mode Theater.

References

Historic districts on the National Register of Historic Places in Wisconsin
National Register of Historic Places in Jefferson County, Wisconsin